Aries may refer to:
Aries (astrology), an astrological sign
Aries (constellation), a constellation of stars in the zodiac

Arts, entertainment and media
Aries (album), by Luis Miguel, 1993
Aries (EP), by Alice Chater, 2020
"Aries" (song), by Gorillaz, 2020
Aries (comics), fictional characters in Marvel Comics
Aries (journal), a journal of the European Society for the Study of Western Esotericism

People
Austin Aries (Daniel Healy Solwold Jr, born 1978), American professional wrestler
Lolee Aries (1957-2018), American television producer 
Philippe Ariès (1914–1984), French historian
Joseph Hyacinthe Louis Jules d'Ariès (1813–1878), French naval officer

Science and technology
Aries (rocket)
Algorithms for Recovery and Isolation Exploiting Semantics, a recovery algorithm in computer science
Apache Aries, a set of software components 
Aries, an interconnect in the Cray XC30 architecture

Transportation
Dodge Aries, an automobile
Ariès, a French automobile 1902–1937
Aries Motorsport, a British kit car manufacturer
EP-3E Aries, a reconnaissance aircraft
Miles Aries, a development of the Miles Gemini aircraft
, a North Sea ferry
, the name of several ships

Other uses
Arieș, a river in Romania
Aries (mountain), in Olympic National Park, Washington, U.S.
Aryabhatta Research Institute of Observational Sciences, in India
Aries Telecoms, a Malaysian computer supplier

See also

Arieș (disambiguation)
Aeris (disambiguation)
AIRES, Colombian airline
Ares (disambiguation)
Aris (disambiguation)
Arius (disambiguation)
Aries in Chinese astronomy
Eros, Greek god of lust
Ovis aries, sheep